Ishii Fudeko (born Watanabe Fude, 27 April 1861 (Bunkyu-1) - 24 January 1944 (Showa-19)) was a pioneer of modern education for Japanese girls, and one of the first founders of welfare for people with mental disabilities in Japan.

Early life 
Born as the eldest daughter of Watanabe Kiyoshi and Gen, her father was a feudal retainer of the Hizen Ōmura clan, a patriot through the end of the Tokugawa period to the Meiji Restoration, and the Meiji government appointed him a baron for his service as the Fukuoka prefecture Ordinance and a Councilor of the Genroin Senate. Fudeko's uncle, Watanabe Noboru, was also a meritorious man with a friendship with patriot Sakamoto Ryōma at the turn of Meiji Restoration contributing for the Satsuma Alliance. Watanabe Tei was her younger half brother and he became the third school principal of Takinogawa Gakuen.

Study abroad 

After graduating from Tokyo Jogakko, a national girls' school, Fudeko studied in Europe per the order of Empress Kōmyō, and returned to Japan to become a teacher at Kazoku Jogakko (literary Girls' School for the Nobles, present Gakushuin) and taught French to daughters of imperial and aristocrat families, together with Tsuda Umeko who also studied abroad with her. Among her students, there was Empress Teimei. Fudeko was also a popular figure and frequented the balls at the Rokumeikan, being reputed as "the flower of the Rokumeikan".

Taking office as a principal of Seishu Girls' School, Fudeko was a leader in modern education for girl students. The School was succeeded to Tsuda Umeko's Joshi Eigakujuku (literary Girls' School for English Studies), the present Tsuda College.

Her husband was Ogashima Minoru (1857-1892), a high-ranking official also from her village.  They had three daughters; the two elder daughters were born with intellectual disabilities, and the youngest died at birth.  She was widowed when her husband died at the age of 35 in 1892. Fudeko was baptized around that period.

School for disabled children 
She had her daughters to Takinogawa Gakuen school under the care of principal Ishii Ryoichi, and she did not spare economic and spiritual support to the school. Fudeko understood Ryoichi 's mission in life as well as his personality to marry him, and she started to contribute for the protection, education and independence of mentally handicapped persons.
Under Militia, an individual with intellectual disability was regarded as a burden to the society being not capable for manufacturing or as a labor. Sympathy or understanding for those was extremely low, and those disabled lived locked up in rooms more than frequently. While Fudeko actually taught at her classes, she succeeded in receiving economic support to Takinogawa Gakuen through her contact with her alumni at Tokyo Jogakko and her students as members of the royal family, wives of aristocrats and successful business people; they contributed to her school to keep running and expanded at a modest schale.
In her later years, she was half-paralyzed after suffering stroke, lost her husband who left her a huge debt and their school. While she once considered to closing their school, but decided to keep her husband 's will, and on October 16, 1937 at the age of 76 years, Fudeko took office as the second school principal. However, it was the wartime when she lost lives of her students as well as faculty members, Isii Fudeko died at the age of 83 uncertain of her school's future.
The Takinogawa school had survived the war and continued on to be the current Takinogawa Gakuen, incorporated as a social welfare institute.

Bibliography

Her books

Further reading
Books

 

Periodicals

Film and others

Gaimusho kiroku "Amerika-koku fujin kurabu rengou taikai kaisetu ni tsuki Tsuda Umeko hoka ichimei sanretu ikkentuki eikoku he ousho no ken". 1880 (Meiji 13), 1898 (Meiji 31)

References

1861 births
1944 deaths
19th-century Japanese educators
19th-century Japanese women
Japanese Protestants
Heads of schools in Japan